Lexa may refer to:

 Lexa, Arkansas, a city in Phillips County, United States
 Repressor lexA

People 
 Lexa (name)
 Lexa (singer) (born 1995), Brazilian singer
 Leo Kinnunen (1943–2017), Finnish former racing driver nicknamed Leksa
 Count Alois Lexa von Aehrenthal (1854–1912), Bohemian-Austrian diplomat

Fictional entities
 Lexa (The 100), a fictional character in the TV series The 100

See also 
 Alexandra (disambiguation)
 Leksa (Norwegian toponym)
 Lex (disambiguation)
 Lexus